Turlogh Dubh O'Brien or Black Turlogh, is a fictional 11th Century Irishman created by Robert E. Howard.

Stories

 The Gods of Bal-Sagoth (first published in Weird Tales, October 1931) - Also known as The Blond Goddess of Bal-Sagoth, this was written to be a sequel to The Dark Man despite its seeing print before that story. This story can be found on Wikisource. It was adapted as a Conan story by Marvel Comics in Conan the Barbarian #17 (Aug 1972) and #18 (Sep 1972) written by Roy Thomas and drawn by Gil Kane.

 The Dark Man (first published in Weird Tales, December 1931) - Turlogh rescues the daughter of King Brian Boru from a tribe of Vikings. This story features a cameo of another Howard character, Bran Mak Morn.  This story can be found on Wikisource. It was adapted as a Conan story by Marvel Comics.

The Shadow of the Hun (an unfinished draft first published posthumously in Shadow of the Hun, 1975) - This story can be found on Wikisource

 Spears of Clontarf (first published posthumously in a Spears of Clontarf chapbook, 1978) - A historical adventure story set against the Battle of Clontarf (1014). Howard later rewrote this unsold story twice.  One version, The Grey God Passes, is very similar to Spears of Clontarf with added fantasy elements, and the other The Cairn on the Headland is a modern horror story that Howard saw published in Strange Tales (Jan., 1933).

 The Twilight of the Grey Gods - also known as The Grey God Passes. This is Howard's re-write of Spears of Clontarf (see above) with added fantasy elements (first published posthumously in Dark Mind, Dark Heart, Arkham House, 1962)

In addition to these there is an untitled and unfinished piece that begins "The Dane came in with a rush, hurtling his huge body forward..."  This was first published in Shadow of the Hun (1975).

References

External links
 List of Turlogh Dubh O'Brien stories at HowardWorks.com

Characters in pulp fiction
Literary characters introduced in 1931
Robert E. Howard characters
Fictional Irish people
Fiction set in the 11th century